William Thomas Barrot (6 May 1944 – 29 November 2016) was a professional Australian rules football player who played in the Victorian Football League (VFL), the South Australian Football League (SANFL) and the Victorian Football Association (VFA).

Family
The son of Wesley Thomas Barrot (1917-1978), and Peggy Eileen Barrot (1923-2016), née French, William Thomas Barrot was born at Melbourne on 6 May 1944.

His brother Wes Barrot, a professional sprinter, also played VFL football with Richmond and with Collingwood.

Football
Barrot made his senior VFL in 1961 for Richmond Football Club where he was known with popular affection as Bustling Billy. Playing as a centreman, Barrot was a best and fairest winner in 1965, an interstate representative and a major driving force behind the Tigers' 1967 grand final win. However, Barrot was prone to injury that limited his senior VFL appearances for the Tigers to just 120 in ten seasons.

In 1971, Barrot was traded to St Kilda in exchange for Ian Stewart. Barrot never truly settled at Moorabbin Oval, managing just a couple of games, and later in the year he was traded to Carlton Football Club, where he finished his VFL career.

In 1972 Barrot played for VFA side Oakleigh which had endured a lean time for more than a decade.  Barrot's impact, both on and off the field, was immediate and pronounced, and the Devils won the first division grand final.

Moving to Adelaide, Barrot was appointed as captain-coach of SANFL club West Torrens. After running seventh in 1973 the Eagles endured a horror start to the 1974 season which ultimately precipitated Barrot's departure, in somewhat acrimonious circumstances, midway through the year.  He finished his career back at Oakleigh, where he took over as coach.

Years later whilst playing in a Richmond legends game, Barrot suffered a heart attack and almost died on the field.

Death
Barrot died on 29 November 2016 aged 72.

See also
 Australian Football World Tour

Notes

References 
 Hogan P (1996),  The Tigers of Old: A complete History of Every Player to Represent the Richmond Football Club between 1908 and 1996, Richmond FC, (Melbourne). 
 Ross, J. (ed.) (1996), 100 Years of Australian Football 1897–1996: The Complete Story of the AFL, All the Big Stories, All the Great Pictures, All the Champions, Every AFL Season Reported, Ringwood: Viking.

External links

 
 William 'Bustling Billy' Barrot, at The VFA Project.
 Richmond Football Club – Hall of Fame
 West Torrens Honour Board.

1944 births
2016 deaths
Australian people of French descent
Australian rules footballers from Victoria (Australia)
Richmond Football Club players
Jack Dyer Medal winners
St Kilda Football Club players
Carlton Football Club players
Oakleigh Football Club players
Oakleigh Football Club coaches
West Torrens Football Club players
West Torrens Football Club coaches
Richmond Football Club Premiership players
Two-time VFL/AFL Premiership players